Briton Ferry Road railway station served the town of Briton Ferry, in the historical county of Glamorganshire, Wales, from 1863 to 1936 on the Vale of Neath Railway. Nearby was Llandarcy Oil Refinery.

History 
The station was opened on 1 August 1863 by the Vale of Neath Railway. It temporarily closed on 1 March 1873 but reopened on 1 October 1880, before closing permanently on 28 September 1936.

References 

Disused railway stations in Neath Port Talbot
Railway stations in Great Britain opened in 1863
Railway stations in Great Britain closed in 1873
Railway stations in Great Britain opened in 1880
Railway stations in Great Britain closed in 1936
1863 establishments in Wales
1936 disestablishments in Wales
Former Great Western Railway stations